The 2013 Ukrainian Figure Skating Championships took place on December 18–21, 2012 in Kyiv. Skaters competed in the disciplines of men's singles, ladies' singles, pair skating, and ice dancing on the senior level. The results may be used as part of Ukraine's selection process for the 2013 World Championships and 2013 European Championships.

The junior-level event was held from January 31 to February 2, 2013.

Senior results

Men

Ladies

Pairs

Ice dancing

References

2013
2013 in figure skating
2012 in figure skating
Figure Skating Championships,2013
Figure Skating Championships,2013